Andrewe is a surname. Notable people with the surname include:

Laurence Andrewe (fl. 1510–1537), French translator and printer
Thomas Andrewe (fl. 1604), English poet

See also
Andrewes
Andrew (surname)
Andrews (surname)